Paradentiscutata maritima is a species of fungus. It is characterised by introverted ornamentations on the spore wall; the spore wall structure and germ shield morphology. It was first isolated in northeast Brazil, and can be distinguished by the projections on the outer spore surface.

References

Further reading

Souza, Renata G., et al. "Use of mycorrhizal seedlings on recovery of mined dunes in northeastern Brazil." Pedobiologia 55.6 (2012): 303–309.
da Silva, Danielle Karla Alves, et al. "Diversity of arbuscular mycorrhizal fungi in restinga and dunes areas in Brazilian Northeast." Biodiversity and Conservation 21.9 (2012): 2361–2373.
da Silva, Danielle Karla Alves, et al. "Communities of arbuscular mycorrhizal fungi on a vegetation gradient in tropical coastal dunes." Applied Soil Ecology 96 (2015): 7–17.

External links

MycoBank

Glomeromycota